Joanne Berdan (née Bouw born May 1, 1963) is a Canadian medallist in Paralympic athletics. During her Paralympic career, Berdan won a total of 10 Paralympic medals. She was inducted into both the Canadian Paralympic Committee Hall of Fame and Canadian Disability Hall of Fame in 2003.

Early life and education
Berdan was born on May 1, 1963, in St. Catharines, Ontario. She completed her post-secondary studies at the University of Toronto in 1986.

Career
Berdan won her first Paralympic medals at the 1984 Summer Paralympics. She won a gold in shot put and javelin alongside a bronze in discus and long jump. At the following Paralympics, Berdan was gold in the discus, javelin and shot put events during the 1988 Summer Paralympics. Her final Paralympic medals were at the 1992 Summer Paralympics where she repeated her three golds medals from the previous Paralympics.

Alongside her Paralympic medals in 1992, Berdan broke the world records for shot put and discus in the cerebral palsy sport classification. While she competed at the 1996 Summer Paralympics in the shot put and discus, Berdan did not medal. Outside of the Paralympics, Berdan won gold at the 1990 World Championships and Games for the Disabled and the 1994 IPC Athletics World Championships. She ended her sports career in 1996 and is currently working in pharmacy.

Awards and honours
In 2002, Berdan was awarded the Golden Jubilee Medal. The following year, Berdan was inducted into the Canadian Paralympic Committee Hall of Fame  and the Canadian Disability Hall of Fame. Other hall of fame inductions include the Canadian Cerebral Palsy Sports Association Hall of Fame in 2005  and the University of Toronto Sports Hall of Fame in 2015.

Personal life
Berdan is married and has one child.

References

1963 births
Living people
Cerebral Palsy category Paralympic competitors
Paralympic bronze medalists for Canada
Paralympic gold medalists for Canada
Paralympic track and field athletes of Canada
Sportspeople from St. Catharines
Canadian Disability Hall of Fame
Medalists at the 1984 Summer Paralympics
Medalists at the 1988 Summer Paralympics
Medalists at the 1992 Summer Paralympics
Athletes (track and field) at the 1984 Summer Paralympics
Athletes (track and field) at the 1988 Summer Paralympics
Athletes (track and field) at the 1992 Summer Paralympics
Athletes (track and field) at the 1996 Summer Paralympics
Paralympic medalists in athletics (track and field)
Canadian female discus throwers
Canadian female javelin throwers
Canadian female shot putters